Accolay is a former commune in the Yonne department in Bourgogne-Franche-Comté in north-central France. On 1 January 2017, it was merged with Cravant into the new commune of Deux Rivières. The population of Accolay was 448 inhabitants as of January 1, 2019.

The commune is bordered by the Cure River and the Nivernais Canal, just beside it. The canal junction was built in the 19th century to transport wood by timber rafting from the Morvan forests to Paris.

Accolay is one of the most ancient locations of the Yonne department, first mentioned in a document by the Bishop of Auxerre, Saint Aunaire, in the 6th century under the name Accolacus. The name is from the Gaulish patronym Accola with the suffix acus, which was applied to settlements along Roman .

The Saint-Nizier church has a chancel and a Romanesque apsel separated by a classic nave. The first church on this site was built in the 11th century, and the present building dates from the 18th century. The church possesses three statues dating from 1695, classified as national monuments.

The village was noted as a producer of pottery and ceramics that became renowned between 1945 and 1983.

The commune boasts, amongst others, a library, an elementary school, a children's nursery, a recreation centre, a municipal camping ground and a post office.

Population

See also
Communes of the Yonne department

References

External references 
 Official Site of the commune (in French)
 Official Site of Accolay's Potters
 Website of the area tourist office

Former communes of Yonne